The 2012 Olympic Wrestling Pan American Qualification Tournament was the second regional qualifying tournament for the 2012 Olympics. The competition was held in Kissimmee, United States from 23 to 25 March 2012.

The top two wrestlers in each weight class earn a qualification spot for their nation.

Men's freestyle

55 kg
24 March

60 kg
25 March

66 kg
25 March

74 kg
25 March

84 kg
25 March

96 kg
25 March

120 kg
25 March

Men's Greco-Roman

55 kg
23 March

60 kg
23 March

66 kg
23 March

74 kg
23 March

84 kg
23 March

96 kg
23 March

120 kg
24 March

Women's freestyle

48 kg
24 March

55 kg
24 March

63 kg
24 March

72 kg
24 March

References

External links
UWW Database

America
Olympic Q America
2012 Q